Tyler Lyttle (born 12 November 1996) is an English footballer who plays for  Stourbridge, where he plays as a defender.

Playing career

Bristol Rovers
After failing to make the breakthrough at Wolverhampton Wanderers, Lyttle joined Bristol Rovers in 2014. After receiving the Youth Team Player of the Year award, he signed his first professional deal on 19 June 2015.

On 29 August 2015 Lyttle made his professional debut, starting in a 0–2 away loss against Leyton Orient.

In December 2015, Lyttle was loaned to National League North side Nuneaton Town on an initial month long loan deal, which was extended to the end of the season the following month. He remained at Liberty Way until April 2016 when he was recalled by Rovers.

Stafford Rangers
Lyttle departed Bristol Rovers for Stafford Rangers on 10 March 2017.

Hednesford Town
Lyttle signed for Hednesford Town on 4 September 2017.

Sutton Coldfield Town
After just over a month with Hednesford Town, Lyttle moved on an signed for Sutton Coldfield Town on 7 October 2017.

Rushall Olympic

Tyler signed for Southern League Premier Central side Rushall Olympic on 25 July 2018.

On 3 June 2022, Rushall Olympic confirmed that Lyttle had re-signed, and would make the 2022–23 season his fifth campaign with the club.

Stourbridge
In September 2022, Lyttle joined Rushall Olympic's league rivals Stourbridge.

Personal life
Tyler is the son of former Swansea City, Nottingham Forest and West Brom defender, Des Lyttle. He coached Tyler's U18 side to an ESFA National Cup win, after his release from Wolves, at the Thomas Telford Academy in Shropshire. Father and son also recently competed against each other in the Great Donnington Run for charity.

References

External links

1996 births
Living people
English footballers
Association football defenders
Bristol Rovers F.C. players
Nuneaton Borough F.C. players
Truro City F.C. players
Stafford Rangers F.C. players
Hednesford Town F.C. players
Sutton Coldfield Town F.C. players
Rushall Olympic F.C. players
Stourbridge F.C. players
English Football League players
National League (English football) players
Southern Football League players